Prodromus Florae Novae Hollandiae et Insulae Van Diemen (Prodromus of the Flora of New Holland and Van Diemen's Land) is a flora of Australia written by botanist Robert Brown and published in 1810. Often referred to as Prodromus Flora Novae Hollandiae, or by its standard botanical abbreviation Prodr. Fl. Nov. Holland., it was the first attempt at a survey of the Australian flora. It described over 2040 species, over half of which were published for the first time.

Brown's Prodromus was originally published as Volume One, and following the Praemonenda (Preface), page numbering commences on page 145. Sales of the Prodromus were so poor, however, that Brown withdrew it from sale. Due to the commercial failure of the first volume, pages 1 to 144 were never issued, and Brown never produced the additional volumes that he had planned.

In 1813, a book of illustrations for the Prodromus was published separately by Ferdinand Bauer under the title Ferdinandi Bauer Illustrationes florae Novae Hollandiae sive icones generum quae in Prodromo florae Novae Hollandiae et Insulae Van Diemen descripsit Robertus Brown, usually referred to as Illustrationes Florae Novae Hollandiae. The Prodromus itself was eventually reprinted in 1819, and a slightly modified second edition released in 1821. In 1830, Brown published a short supplement to the Prodromus, entitled Supplementum Primum Prodromi Florae Novae Hollandiae.

References

Bibliography 

 

1810 non-fiction books
Books about Australian natural history
Florae (publication)
Botany in Australia
1810 in science
1810 in Australia
Works by Robert Brown (botanist, born 1773)
19th-century Latin books